Rosulje is a village in the municipality of Gornji Vakuf, Bosnia and Herzegovina.
Rosulje a is located at about 700 meters above sea level, on slightly sloping slopes above the Vrbas valley.

Demographics 
According to the 2013 census, its population was 40, all Croats.

References

Populated places in Gornji Vakuf-Uskoplje